Maria Violante Placido (born 1 May 1976) is an Italian actress and singer.

Early life
Placido was born in Rome, Italy. She is the daughter of actor-director Michele Placido and actress Simonetta Stefanelli.

Career

Film
Her film debut was alongside her father in Quattro bravi ragazzi (1993), and later took part in Jack Frusciante Left the Band. Her first important role was in L'anima gemella, directed by Sergio Rubini.

Placido's other movies include Ora o mai più, by Lucio Pellegrini, Che ne sarà di noi, by Giovanni Veronesi, and Ovunque sei, directed by her father. In 2006, she starred in Pupi Avati's comedy La cena per farli conoscere, released in 2007. In March 2009, she played a role in the Hindi movie Barah Aana. She also played the title role as Moana Pozzi in the 2009 miniseries Moana. In 2010, she appeared alongside George Clooney in the drama-thriller The American.

Placido played Nadya in the 2011 film Ghost Rider: Spirit of Vengeance, a sequel to the 2007 film Ghost Rider, both based on the Marvel Comics character of the same name.

TV
She co-stars in Transporter: The Series, a spin-off from the film franchise of the same name. The TV series stars Chris Vance taking over the role of Frank Martin from Jason Statham. In season two, she plays Caterina Boldieu, a former French intelligence officer, who is assisting Frank Martin, the Transporter.

Music
In 2006, Placido released, under the name Viola, her first album as a singer, "Don't Be Shy...", including 10 tracks she wrote (most of which are in English), inspired by Stuart Benson. Viola sings in the style of singer-songwriter Suzanne Vega. The second single is "How to Save Your Life". Subsequently, she collaborated with the Italian singer-songwriter Bugo in the remake duet version of his song "Amore mio infinito".

Filmography

Film

Television

Personal life
Violante Placido has one child. The father is her partner, Massimiliano D'Epiro, who is an Italian film director.

References

External links
  
 
 

1976 births
Living people
20th-century Italian actresses
21st-century Italian actresses
21st-century Italian singers
21st-century Italian women singers
Actresses from Rome
Italian film actresses